Jan Craninckx from the Interuniversity Microelectronics Center (IMEC), Leuven, Belgium was named Fellow of the Institute of Electrical and Electronics Engineers (IEEE) in 2014 for contributions to the design of CMOS RF transceivers.

References

Fellow Members of the IEEE
Living people
Year of birth missing (living people)
Place of birth missing (living people)